Elections in 1979 were held on Thursday 5 May.

Following the elections the Labour Party had overall control of Wolverhampton Metropolitan Borough Council.

The Wolverhampton Association of Ratepayers became known simply as Ratepayers in the 1979 local elections.

The composition of the council prior to the election was:

Labour 28
Conservative 30
Wolverhampton Association of Ratepayers 2

The composition of the council following the election was:

Labour 30
Conservative 29
Ratepayers 1

Election results

Conservative gain from Ratepayers

External links

1979
Wolverhampton Metropolitan Borough Council election
1970s in the West Midlands (county)